Samuel Rosa de Alvarenga (born July 15, 1966) is lead singer, primary composer and guitarist of Brazilian rock band Skank. He has a psychology degree from Universidade Federal de Minas Gerais.

Samuel writes the music for most of the group's songs, with 80% of the lyrics by Chico Amaral. Other songwriting partners were Nando Reis, Arnaldo Antunes, and Lô Borges.

Samuel is an avid football fan and supports Cruzeiro.

References

1966 births
Living people
21st-century Brazilian male singers
21st-century Brazilian singers
Brazilian male guitarists
20th-century Brazilian male singers
20th-century Brazilian singers
Brazilian rock musicians
People from Belo Horizonte
Brazilian rock singers
Latin Grammy Award winners
Latin music songwriters
Rock songwriters